(October 19, 1910 – December 7, 2009) was a Japanese field hockey player who competed in the 1932 Summer Olympics and 1936 Summer Olympics.

Hamada was born in what is now part of Minamiawaji, Hyōgo, Japan. In 1932, while a student at Keio University, he was selected to be a member of the Japanese field hockey team at the 1932 Los Angeles Olympics. He played two matches as goalkeeper. Thirteen goals were scored against him, but the team won the silver medal.

Four years later, Hamada was a member of the Japanese field hockey team at the 1936 Berlin Olympics. The team won two games and lost one in elimination round and did not advance. Hamada played all three matches as goalkeeper, during which eleven goals were scored against him.

Hamada died of heart failure in Shibuya, Tokyo on December 7, 2009 at the age of 99.

References

External links
 

1910 births
2009 deaths
Sportspeople from Hyōgo Prefecture
Keio University alumni
Japanese male field hockey players
Olympic field hockey players of Japan
Field hockey players at the 1932 Summer Olympics
Field hockey players at the 1936 Summer Olympics
Olympic silver medalists for Japan
Olympic medalists in field hockey
Medalists at the 1932 Summer Olympics
20th-century Japanese people